The 1937–38 season was Port Vale's 32nd season of football in the English Football League, and their second successive season (third overall) in the Third Division North. With thirty goals, Jack Roberts was the division's top scorer. However the club managed only a mid-table finish, also exiting both cup competitions at the first stage.

Overview

Third Division North
The pre-season saw the arrival of goalkeepers James Nicholls and George Heppell (Brentford and Wolverhampton Wanderers); veteran right-back Johnny Rowe (Queen's Park Rangers); left-back Harry Johnson (Newcastle United); winger Charlie Rattray (Mansfield Town); experienced inside-right Arthur Masters (Nottingham Forest); and 'clever' inside-left William Price (Fulham). Pre-season training included bowls, cricket, and practice with rubbers balls and rubber boots to improve ball control. The fans were not optimistic for the campaign, and so ticket sales were low despite lowered prices.

The season began with a 3–0 defeat at Oldham Athletic's Boundary Park. Tom Nolan found himself dropped in favour of Jack Roberts, who immediately went on a run of three goals in three games. The team went on to go six games unbeaten, including a 4–0 win over Barrow in which Roberts scored all four. Their 5–1 win over Hartlepools United – in which Arthur Caldwell scored a hat-trick – took them into seventh in the table. This run ended with a 5–0 drubbing at Valley Parade. After this defeat to Bradford City the Vale signed forward Ken Fish from Aston Villa for 'a sizeable fee'. In November, William Price was released from his contract. The next month the side were on the end of a 7–2 beating by Chester at Sealand Road. Soon after this Tom Morgan was re-appointed as manager, having been demoted to assistant-secretary in June 1932. Immediately following this the club went on a run of one defeat in nine games. During this run Roberts scored a hat-trick past Accrington Stanley in a 4–1 win.

In February, Tommy Ward was traded to Stoke City in exchange for Harry Davies and a small fee. On 5 March, Vale inflicted a 4–3 win over Bradford City, soon after which Sam Baum was signed from Bolton Wanderers just two minutes before the transfer deadline closed. On 15 April, the club saw its first five-figure crowd of the season, as promotion-chasing Hull City took away both the points despite a brace from Roberts. Revenge came at Anlaby Road three days later, when the "Valiants" held a clean sheet to damage the "Tigers" promotion prospects. On the final home game of the season a seventeen-year-old Alf Bellis scored on his debut as Vale beat Rochdale 4–1.

They finished fifteenth with 38 points, just six points clear of the re-election zone. Away from The Old Recreation Ground the side struggled, managing just a single win. Jack Roberts was the club's top goalscorer with 28 league strikes in 37 games – also making him the division's top scorer.

Finances
On the financial side, a bare profit of some £300 was recorded, due to a transfer credit of £2,900. The annual summer clear-out saw the departure of fourteen of the twenty-six players, including Sam Baum; Spencer Evans (Northwich Victoria); Roderick Welsh; Charlie Rattray (Accrington Stanley); Harry Johnson (Hartlepools United); Trevor Rhodes; and Fred Obrey (who was sold to Tranmere Rovers). At the season's end the club were delighted to hear they had been transferred to the Third Division South, where gate receipts were higher. On 27 June another meeting at the Grand Hotel (Hanley) saw the issue of a name change debated, where Stoke United and Stoke North End were again considered. A change of name was advocated by every letter written in by supporters, however once again there was insufficient time to implement a name change before the upcoming season.

Cup competitions
In the FA Cup, a First Round exit came at the hands of Midland League Gainsborough Trinity, after Trinity won the replay 2–1. In the short-lived Football League Third Division North Cup, Vale went out in the First Round to Tranmere Rovers – a 1–1 stalemate at home was followed by a 2–0 defeat in the replay at Prenton Park.

League table

Results
Port Vale's score comes first

Football League Third Division North

Results by matchday

Matches

FA Cup

Third Division North Cup

Player statistics

Appearances

Top scorers

Transfers

Transfers in

Transfers out

References
Specific

General

Port Vale F.C. seasons
Port Vale